UFC 246: McGregor vs. Cowboy was a mixed martial arts event produced by the Ultimate Fighting Championship that took place on January 18, 2020 at the T-Mobile Arena in Paradise, Nevada, part of the Las Vegas Metropolitan Area, United States.

Background
A welterweight bout between former UFC Featherweight and Lightweight Champion Conor McGregor and former lightweight title challenger Donald Cerrone served as the event headliner.

A women's bantamweight rematch between former UFC Women's Bantamweight Champion Holly Holm and former title challenger Raquel Pennington was initially scheduled to take place at UFC 243. The pairing previously met in February 2015 at UFC 184, with Holm winning the encounter via split decision. However, it was revealed on September 27, 2019 that Holm withdrew from the bout due to a hamstring injury and the bout was cancelled. The bout was rescheduled and took place at this event.

Grant Dawson was expected to face Chas Skelly in a featherweight bout at the event. However, the bout was scrapped on January 14 after Dawson announced that he was forced to withdraw.

Former UFC Women's Strawweight Championship challenger Cláudia Gadelha was expected to face Alexa Grasso at the event. However, on the day of the weigh-ins, Grasso weighed in at 121.5 pounds, 5.5 pounds over the strawweight non-title fight limit of 116 pounds. The Nevada State Athletic Commission (NSAC) decided to remove the fight because competitors are not allowed to compete if the weight between them is over 3 pounds.

Results

Bonus awards
The following fighters received $50,000 bonuses.
Fight of the Night: No bonus awarded. 
Performance of the Night: Conor McGregor, Aleksei Oleinik, Brian Kelleher, Carlos Diego Ferreira and Drew Dober

Reported payout
The following is the reported payout to the fighters as reported to the Nevada State Athletic Commission (NSAC). It does not include sponsor money and also does not include the UFC's traditional "fight night" bonuses. The total disclosed payout for the event was $4,434,000.
 Conor McGregor: $3,000,000 (no win bonus) def. Donald Cerrone: $200,000
 Holly Holm: $200,000 (includes $50,000 win bonus) def. Raquel Pennington: $63,000
 Aleksei Oleinik: $150,000 (includes $75,000 win bonus) def. Maurice Greene: $30,000
 Brian Kelleher: $46,000 (includes $23,000 win bonus) def. Ode' Osborne: $10,000
 Carlos Diego Ferreira: $100,000 (includes $50,000 win bonus) def. Anthony Pettis: $155,000
 Roxanne Modafferi: $62,000 (includes $31,000 win bonus) def. Maycee Barber: $29,000 
 Sodiq Yusuff: $54,000 (includes $27,000 win bonus) def. Andre Fili: $55,000
 Askar Askarov: $20,000 (includes $10,000 win bonus) def. Tim Elliott: $31,000 
 Drew Dober: $110,000 (includes $55,000 win bonus) def. Nasrat Haqparast: $25,000
 Aleksa Camur: $20,000 (includes $10,000 win bonus) def. Justin Ledet: $20,000
 Sabina Mazo: $24,000 (includes $12,000 win bonus) def. JJ Aldrich: $30,000

See also 

 List of UFC events
 List of current UFC fighters
 2020 in UFC

References 
 

Ultimate Fighting Championship events
2020 in mixed martial arts
Mixed martial arts in Las Vegas
2020 in sports in Nevada
January 2020 sports events in the United States
Events in Paradise, Nevada